Karsten Braasch and Michael Stich were the defending champions, but Stich retired after the 1997 season and Braasch played with Jens Knippschild, but lost in the first roundEllis Ferreira and Rick Leach won the final 4–6, 6–4, 7–6 against John-Laffnie de Jager and Marc-Kevin Goellner.

Seeds

  Jacco Eltingh /  Paul Haarhuis (first round)
  Ellis Ferreira /  Rick Leach (champions)
  Jim Grabb /  David Macpherson (quarterfinals)
  David Adams /  Yevgeny Kafelnikov (first round)

Draw

Draw

References
Main Draw

1998 Gerry Weber Open